Holalu  is a village in the middle state of Karnataka, India. It is located in the Hoovina Hadagali taluk of Vijayanagara district in Karnataka.

The historical village has been growing up in marketing.  The famous Anantashayana temple is also located here.

Demographics
 India census, Holalu had a population of 8949 with 4609 males and 4340 females.

See also
 Vijayanagara
 Districts of Karnataka

References

External links
 http://Ballari.nic.in/

Villages in Bellary district